Raj Krishna Dawn is an Indian politician. He was elected to the Lok Sabha, the lower house of the Parliament of India from the Burdwan constituency of West Bengal in 1977 as a member of the Janata Party.

References

External links
 Official biographical sketch in Parliament of India website

1930 births
Janata Party politicians
Lok Sabha members from West Bengal
India MPs 1977–1979
Living people
People from Bardhaman